The canton of Saint-Paulien is an administrative division of the Haute-Loire department, south-central France. Its borders were modified at the French canton reorganisation which came into effect in March 2015. Its seat is in Saint-Paulien.

It consists of the following communes:
 
Bellevue-la-Montagne
Blanzac
Borne
Céaux-d'Allègre
Chaspuzac
Fix-Saint-Geneys
Lissac
Loudes
Saint-Geneys-près-Saint-Paulien
Saint-Jean-de-Nay
Saint-Paulien
Saint-Privat-d'Allier
Saint-Vidal
Sanssac-l'Église
Vazeilles-Limandre
Vergezac
Vernassal
Le Vernet

References

Cantons of Haute-Loire